2007 Finals Series can refer to:

2007 AFL finals series
2007 NRL Finals Series